Qui-Gon Jinn is a fictional character in the Star Wars franchise, played by Liam Neeson. He is a main character in the prequel film trilogy, serving as the protagonist of The Phantom Menace (1999). He appears briefly as a Force ghost in the 2008 animated series The Clone Wars, the season finale of the 2022 live-action series Obi-Wan Kenobi, along with Attack of The Clones and The Rise of Skywalker as a disembodied voice, with Neeson reprising his role in all of the above. Qui-Gon also appears in two episodes of Tales of the Jedi, which depicts some scenes from his life before the events of The Phantom Menace; Neeson voices adult Qui-Gon in the series, while his son Micheál Richardson voices Qui-Gon as a padawan.

Within the fictional Star Wars universe, Qui-Gon mentors Obi-Wan Kenobi, and is a powerful and wise, yet controversial Jedi Master, who has many uncommon beliefs regarding The Force. In The Phantom Menace, his and Obi-Wan's mission to protect Queen Padmé Amidala leads him to encounter the young slave Anakin Skywalker, whom he believes to be the prophesied "Chosen One" who will bring balance to the Force. Qui-Gon is fatally wounded in a lightsaber duel by the Sith Lord Darth Maul. In his final moments, he makes Obi-Wan promise that he will train the young Skywalker. In the second film Attack of the Clones, Qui-Gon’s disembodied voice is heard as he tries to reach out to Anakin after the latter taps into the dark side of the force following the death of his mother at the hands of Tusken Raiders. The same film also introduces his former Jedi mentor Count Dooku, who fell to the dark side and became a Sith Lord, Darth Tyranus. At the end of Revenge of the Sith, it is revealed that Qui-Gon has learned how to become a Force spirit after death, teaching the idea to Yoda during the Clone Wars and later to Obi-Wan.

Outside of the films, the character appears in various canon and non-canon Star Wars media, such as books, comics, and video games. Since the release of The Phantom Menace, Qui-Gon has become one of the most popular Star Wars characters, gaining a cult status. Neeson's portrayal of Qui-Gon has been met with positive reviews, with some critics saying he helped hold the film together significantly. For his role in The Phantom Menace, Neeson was nominated for a 2000 Saturn Award for Best Actor.

Appearances

Film

The Phantom Menace (1999)
Qui-Gon is the main character in the first episode of the prequel trilogy, Star Wars: Episode I – The Phantom Menace. At the age of 48 (on Legends 60), he is a Jedi Master and the mentor of a 25-year old Obi-Wan Kenobi. Unlike other, more conservative Jedi, he values living in the moment as the best way to embrace the Force. Jinn is not a member of the Jedi High Council and had no desire to be.

The Phantom Menace opens with Qui-Gon and Obi-Wan sent to the planet Naboo to resolve a political conflict involving the Trade Federation, a corrupt business conglomerate that has blockaded the planet for political leverage. Upon arrival, they are attacked by their host. The Jedi retreat to the planet and rescue its besieged Queen, Padmé Amidala. Their attempt to run the blockade and make way for the galactic capital of Coruscant succeeds, but the queen's ship is damaged by attacks from a Trade Federation blockade, causing the hyperdrive to malfunction. With no other choice, the ship lands on the desert planet of Tatooine for repairs.

While searching for replacement parts on Tatooine, Qui-Gon discovers a 9-year old slave boy named Anakin Skywalker, who is extraordinarily strong in the Force; a test of his blood reveals that his midi-chlorian count—a measure of Force potential—is the highest ever detected. Qui-Gon becomes intrigued when Anakin's mother, Shmi, tells him that the boy had no father. Knowing that Anakin might be the "Chosen One" of Jedi lore destined to bring balance to the Force, Qui-Gon bets Anakin's freedom and the spaceship parts on a pod race, which Anakin wins. The entourage prepare to leave Tatooine, but encounter a black cloaked lightsaber wielding being that Qui-Gon believes to be a Sith Lord, their brief duel is the first Jedi and Sith battle recorded in a thousand years, which with before escaping on the ship. Upon returning to Coruscant, Qui-Gon asks the Jedi Council to allow Anakin to be trained as a Jedi. Master Yoda senses fear in the boy, and the Council denies his request. Undaunted, Qui-Gon vows that he himself will train Anakin when Obi-Wan becomes a Jedi Knight.

Amidala, R2-D2, and the two Jedi return to Naboo to liberate the planet. There, they encounter the Sith Lord from earlier, who reveals himself to be Darth Maul. After an arduous lightsaber duel, Maul mortally wounds Qui-Gon, but is subsequently defeated by Obi-Wan. Before dying, Qui-Gon makes Obi-Wan promise that he will train Anakin. Qui-Gon is later cremated on a funeral pyre with everyone else witnessing.

Attack of the Clones (2002)
Although Qui-Gon Jinn does not appear physically in Attack of the Clones, he does have a brief voice cameo when Yoda hears Qui-Gon's voice echo out to Anakin through the Force as Anakin slaughters a tribe of Tusken Raiders. In addition, Qui-Gon does appear as a statue in the Jedi Archives in one scene of the movie. Obi-Wan discovers that Qui-Gon's old master, Count Dooku, has become a Sith Lord; and Dooku mentions Qui-Gon as he interrogates a captured Obi-Wan, expressing grief over his former apprentice's death and debating that Qui-Gon would have followed him in leaving the Republic had he survived.

Revenge of the Sith (2005)
In Revenge of the Sith, Yoda reveals to Obi-Wan that Qui-Gon has returned from the "netherworld of the Force" in order to teach both of them how to retain one's consciousness after death.

The Rise of Skywalker (2019)
In The Rise of Skywalker, Qui-Gon's voice is heard speaking to Rey, along with other past Jedi, encouraging her to battle the rejuvenated Darth Sidious. Neeson returned to voice the character.

Television

The Clone Wars (2008–2014; 2020)
In Star Wars: The Clone Wars, the character is mentioned several times throughout the series. Qui-Gon appears in two episodes of the third season. On the mysterious planet Mortis, he informs Obi-Wan in the episode "Overlords" and later Anakin in the episode "Ghosts of Mortis" about the three beings who believe, like Qui-Gon, that Anakin is the Chosen One: the Father (the Unifying Force manifestation), the Daughter (the light side incarnation) and the Son (the dark side embodiment). Later in the sixth-season episode "Voices," Yoda is contacted by the disembodied voice of Qui-Gon. Despite his presence on Mortis, Qui-Gon is revealed to have not been able to manifest a semi-physical form. Following his deceased friend's instructions, Yoda goes on a quest across the galaxy in order to learn the secrets of becoming one with the Force as well. During one of the tests of the Force Priestesses, an illusion of Qui-Gon appears along with Jedi Master Count Dooku and Obi-Wan. It is only after Yoda passes his test that he is allowed to learn Qui-Gon's technique to retain one's consciousness after death.

Rebels (2014–2018)
In Star Wars Rebels while he neither appears nor is mentioned, Obi-Wan finally avenges Qui-Gon Jinn's death in the season 3 episode "Twin Suns", where Obi-Wan and Maul have their final duel on the planet Tatooine. Obi-Wan uses Qui-Gon's favored form of lightsaber combat to bait Maul into overextending himself, allowing him to easily slay him.

Qui-Gon's voice can be heard briefly in the season 4 episode "A World Between Worlds" among many other voices of major Star Wars characters throughout the Skywalker saga, demonstrating how the eponymous realm that Ezra Bridger enters widely spans all time and space in the Star Wars universe.

Obi-Wan Kenobi (2022)
In Obi-Wan Kenobi, the title character tries to reach out to Qui-Gon, but fails. In the final episode "Part VI", Obi-Wan finds his inner peace after confronting Darth Vader, and Qui-Gon's Force Ghost finally appears to him. Qui-Gon tells his former apprentice that he had always been there, but that his grief had made him unable to see him. As Qui-Gon vanishes into the Force, Obi-Wan rides off into the desert, ready to continue his training.

Tales of the Jedi (2022)
In the Tales of the Jedi 6-part mini-series, Qui-Gon appears in the second and fourth episodes. In the second episode, a young Qui-Gon serves as Padawan to Count Dooku, and helps to investigate a mysterious kidnapping on an impoverished planet. Qui-Gon stops Dooku from losing his temper and killing a corrupt senator, and Dooku commends Qui-Gon for being a "wiser man than I". In the fourth episode of the series, an adult Master Qui-Gon and Count Dooku discuss the Jedi Council's refusal to believe Qui-Gon's claim that Darth Maul is a Sith Lord. After Qui-Gon's death, a grieving Dooku remembers how, as a boy, Qui-Gon was fascinated by the tree in the Jedi Temple; Qui-Gon, a native of Coruscant, had never seen a tree before then. Dooku later confronts his secret master, Darth Sidious, claiming that Qui-Gon's death was unnecessary, as Qui-Gon might have been a powerful ally to them.

Novels
A novel involving Qui-Gon and Obi-Wan, set before the events of The Phantom Menace and titled Master and Apprentice, was written by Claudia Gray and released on February 26, 2019.

Video games
Qui-Gon has also appeared in several Star Wars video games: Star Wars Episode I: The Phantom Menace, Star Wars: Jedi Power Battles, Star Wars: Obi-Wan, Star Wars Episode I: Racer,  the Lego Star Wars games and as a character skin (via purchased download content) in Star Wars: The Force Unleashed. A bird version of Qui-Gon, called “Quail-Gon,” is playable in Angry Birds Star Wars II. A Lego Minifigure variant of the character appeared and is playable in Lego Star Wars: The Video Game, Lego Star Wars: The Complete Saga, Lego Star Wars III: The Clone Wars and Lego Star Wars: The Skywalker Saga.

Legends works
With the 2012 acquisition of Lucasfilm by The Walt Disney Company, most of the licensed Star Wars novels and comics produced since the originating 1977 film Star Wars were rebranded as Star Wars Legends and declared non-canon to the franchise in April 2014.

Television

Clone Wars (2003–2005)
In Star Wars: Clone Wars, Qui-Gon makes a cameo appearance in "Chapter 21". During Yoda's Force dream, Qui-Gon tells Anakin to enter the mysterious cave on Dagobah where the boy will see a vision of his future. Later when Obi-Wan reprimands Anakin for being late for his secret Knighthood ceremony, Anakin replies "as far as your wisdom goes, you're no Qui-Gon Jinn!". Ashamed, Anakin apologises and his master admits that he misses Qui-Gon.

Novels
Qui-Gon's life years prior to The Phantom Menace is mainly detailed in the Jedi Apprentice book series. In The Rising Force (set 12 years before The Phantom Menace), Yoda encourages Qui-Gon to take a new Padawan learner, following the failure of his previous apprentice Xanatos, who turned to the dark side of the Force years before. Qui-Gon observes a small lightsaber tournament among a group of the Temple's older students, which includes 12-year-old Obi-Wan. He takes notice of Obi-Wan's skills, but also of the boy's uncontrolled anger and refuses to train him. Shortly following the tournament, the Jedi Knight leaves for a mission to the planet Bandomeer. On the transport ship, Qui-Gon is reunited with Obi-Wan, who is also being sent to Bandomeer to begin life as an agricultural labourer. During the voyage, Qui-Gon and Obi-Wan help defend a group of Arcona from the criminal organization Offworld Corporation. After putting an end to the tense situation, the two arrive on Bandomeer, where Qui-Gon receives a letter signed by his former apprentice Xanatos.

In The Dark Rival, it is revealed that the whole ordeal has been organized by Xanatos, now the leader of Offworld. Qui-Gon sends Obi-Wan off to his Agri-Corps duties, while he plans to meet with Xanatos to find an agreement between Offworld and Bandomeer. However, Xanatos plans to sabotage their meeting and kill Qui-Gon. The Jedi Master duels with his former apprentice, and he and Obi-Wan end Offworld's business on Bandomeer. Xanatos escapes, however. During the encounter with Xanatos, Qui-Gon discovers Obi-Wan's true potential and accepts the boy as his new Padawan. As a gift for Obi-Wan's 13th birthday, Qui-Gon gives his apprentice a special rock he found from the River of Light on his homeworld. In The Captive Temple, Xanatos attacks the Jedi Temple and nearly assassinates Yoda, but Qui-Gon and Obi-Wan thwart his plans, and in The Day of Reckoning, when they chase Xanatos back to his homeworld Telos, the fallen Jedi refuses to surrender and commits suicide. Qui-Gon is thus able to bring closure to a painful chapter of his life.

In Legacy of the Jedi, set during both Qui-Gon's Padawan and Knight years, Qui-Gon and his master Dooku are sent to accompany Senator Blix Annon on a diplomatic assignment. However, space pirates infiltrate their ship and their leader turns out to be rogue Jedi Lorian Nod, a former friend of Dooku's. The two battle and Dooku lets his anger get the best of him, but Qui-Gon prevents his master from violating the Jedi Code by committing cold-blooded murder. Years after their first encounter, Qui-Gon and Obi-Wan encounter Nod and once again the fallen Jedi is incarcerated for his crimes.<ref>Star Wars: Legacy of the Force</ref>

In Secrets of the Jedi (set seven years before The Phantom Menace), Qui-Gon and Obi-Wan are paired with Jedi Master Adi Gallia and her Padawan Siri Tachi. The mission, which results in Qui-Gon and Adi being separated from Obi-Wan and Siri, leads to the discovery of romantic feelings between the two Jedi Padawans. Qui-Gon detects these emotions and warns Obi-Wan of his own example with Tahl, a female Jedi whose murder nearly pushed Qui-Gon over the edge to the dark side.

In Cloak of Deception (set a year before The Phantom Menace), both Jedi fight against a terrorist organization called the Nebula Front, who are secretly following Darth Sidious' orders. At the Trade Federation conference on Eriadu, Qui-Gon and Obi-Wan successfully defend Chancellor Valorum, but do not prevent the deaths of the rest of the Trade Federation Directorate, allowing the Neimoidians to take control of the Federation.

In the 2010 reference book The Jedi Path, Obi-Wan states that some have called Qui-Gon a gray Jedi.

Comics
Aside from the graphic novelization of The Phantom Menace, Qui-Gon appears in the "Stark Hyperspace War" plotline in Star Wars: Republic. In this story arc, which takes place during the same year Qui-Gon takes Obi-Wan as his apprentice, Qui-Gon and Obi-Wan fight in the titular conflict along with other Jedi such as Plo Koon and Quinlan Vos, and Qui-Gon ends up saving Nute Gunray, the future Trade Federation viceroy.

Reception
Despite the mixed reviews that the prequel trilogy received from various movie critics, Liam Neeson's performance and character received positive reviews. Colin Kennedy from Empire Online stated in his review of the film, "Liam Neeson has manfully carried the action on his shoulders throughout (the subsequent prequels desperately miss him) and his final words – “Obi-Wan, promise... Promise me you will train the boy” – provide the movie with its only real weight." Owen Gleiberman from Entertainment Weekly said in his review of The Phantom Menace, "If there’s an actor who holds The Phantom Menace together, it’s Liam Neeson. Tersely commanding, he gives the film its only hints of emotional dynamism."

In 2017, Rolling Stone placed Qui-Gon at the number 25 spot on their 50 Best Star Wars Characters of All Time list.

Behind the scenes

As revealed in The Art of Star Wars: Episode I – The Phantom Menace, director George Lucas conceived the character of Qui-Gon during pre-production of the film. This is shown by concept art where Obi-Wan Kenobi is shown alone in the Trade Federation flagship and while meeting Jar Jar Binks. Even when Qui-Gon was conceived, Lucas toyed with making him the younger Jedi, as shown in concept art depicting Obi-Wan as an older man. Lucas originally envisioned an American actor for the role of Qui-Gon, but ultimately cast Northern Irish actor Liam Neeson because he considered Neeson to have great skills and presence, describing him as a "master actor, who the other actors will look up to, who has got the qualities of strength that the character demands." Initially, Lucas had planned for Qui-Gon to have long white hair, but that idea was scrapped and Qui-Gon is depicted as having long brown hair in the film.

Lucas says the character is "very independent, always testing the rules," and refuses "to go along with the program." Neeson describes him as "wise and quite philosophical, yet very skilled in martial arts. He has incredible confidence, as well as a magical quality that enables him to see into the future. He's not really a rebel, but he has his own code."

During the early development of Revenge of the Sith, Lucas wrote a scene featuring a ghostly Qui-Gon speaking with Yoda about Anakin. Liam Neeson indicated that he was set to reprise his role, but the scene was deleted before being filmed, although it is retained in the film's novelization.

The character's name is derived from the Chinese word qigong (气功 or 氣功), a system of coordinated body movement, breathing, and meditation used for health, spirituality, and martial arts training that allows access to higher realms of awareness, and balance of life energy, similar to Tai chi. This is paired with the Arabic word jinn, meaning "genie" or "tutelary spirit." The name translates almost literally as "Guardian Spirit of the Living Force."  "Jinn" could also refer to the Chinese word for power, jin (勁), and the martial arts concept of fa jin, which is the explosive release of internal strength or power.

Relationships
Mentorship tree

References

Bibliography
 Star Wars Episode I: The Phantom Menace Novelization, 1st edition paperback, 1999. Terry Brooks, George Lucas, 
 Star Wars Episode III: Revenge of the Sith Novelization - Novelization, 1st edition hardcover, 2005. Matthew Woodring Stover, George Lucas, 
 Star Wars Episode I Who's Who: A Pocket Guide to Characters of the Phantom Menace, hardcover, 1999. Ryder Windham, 
 The New Essential Guide to Characters, 1st edition, 2002. Daniel Wallace, Michael Sutfin, 
 Star Wars: The Phantom Menace: The Visual Dictionary, hardcover, 1999. David West Reynolds, 
 Star Wars Roleplaying Game Core Rulebook'', 1st edition, 2000. Bill Slavicsek, Andy Collins,

External links

 
 
 Qui-Gon Jinn on IMDb

Characters created by George Lucas
Fantasy television characters
Fictional ambassadors
Film characters introduced in 1999
Fictional ghosts
Fictional martial arts trainers
Fictional murdered people
Male characters in film
Star Wars Jedi characters
Star Wars Skywalker Saga characters
Star Wars: The Clone Wars characters
Tales of the Jedi (TV series) characters